John E. Streltzer (June 2, 1901 - December 16, 1985) was a legislator in the U.S. state of Colorado, philanthropist, and former U.S. Director of Customs for Colorado and Wyoming.

John was married to Sarah Streltzer, and established a wholesale office supply business in the Denver, Colorado area.

John served nearly three terms as a member of the Colorado House of Representatives in the 1950s. During his third term, President John Kennedy appointed John the Director of Customs for Colorado and Wyoming, a position he held until 1969. John then became Vice President of Public Relations at Metropolitan State Bank (Denver, Colorado), later renamed Metro National Bank and Cherry Creek National Bank, before being consolidated into WestStar Bank and then finally U.S. Bancorp.

John also served as the President of the Ex-Patients Sanatorium (also known as the Ex-Patients Tubercular Home) in Denver, as well as the National Mental Health Center, a Jewish-sponsored mental health hospital which utilized the facilities of the Ex-Patients Sanatorium to provide free treatment and rehabilitation for needy patients with tuberculosis and other chronic diseases and to provide free psychiatric treatment to mentally ill patients. The National Mental Health Center and Ex-Patients Sanatorium were predecessor institutions to the modern, non-sectarian National Jewish Health, an academic medical research facility located in Denver specializing in respiratory, cardiac, immune and allergic disorders.

Throughout his life John was involved in many Jewish, general, and medical causes, including Ex-Patient's Tubercular Home, Israel Bonds, B'nai B'rith, Kiwanis, March of Dimes, AMC Cancer Research Center (JCRS), Red Cross, United Way, and Allied Jewish Welfare Fund.

References

External links
 Colorado Legislature, Record of Legislator (accessed 2015 Oct 25)
 University of Denver (Colorado) Archives
 The John E. Streltzer Papers at University of Denver (Colorado) Special Collections
 Getty Images #162115133 (June 6, 1969), "Ex-Customs Man" John E. Streltzer, recently retired

1901 births
1985 deaths
Jewish American state legislators in Colorado
Democratic Party members of the Colorado House of Representatives
People from Denver
20th-century American politicians
20th-century American Jews